Clyde L. "Buck" Starbeck (January 7, 1900 – December 21, 1957) was an American football coach.   He served as the head football coach at Iowa State Teachers College—now known as the University of Northern Iowa–from 1936 to 1957, compiling a record of 95–58–10.  He died on December 21, 1957, in Cedar Falls, Iowa, after suffering a heart attack.

Head coaching record

College football

References

1900 births
1957 deaths
American football centers
North Dakota Fighting Hawks football coaches
Northern Iowa Panthers football coaches
South Dakota State Jackrabbits football players
High school basketball coaches in Wisconsin
High school football coaches in Wisconsin
People from Montevideo, Minnesota